Parminder Singh Saini (19 September 1957 – 30 May 2021) was a Kenyan field hockey player. He competed at the 1984 Summer Olympics and the 1988 Summer Olympics.

References

External links
 

1957 births
2021 deaths
Kenyan male field hockey players
Olympic field hockey players of Kenya
Field hockey players at the 1984 Summer Olympics
Field hockey players at the 1988 Summer Olympics
People from Kisumu County
Kenyan people of Indian descent
Kenyan people of Punjabi descent
Kenyan expatriates in the United Kingdom